Pinshino is a rural locality (a village) in Vasilyevskoye Rural Settlement, Vashkinsky District, Vologda Oblast, Russia. The population was 93 as of 2002.

Geography 
Pinshino is located 19 km east of Lipin Bor (the district's administrative centre) by road. Popovka-Volotskaya is the nearest rural locality.

References 

Rural localities in Vashkinsky District